The Brown Bears represented Brown University in ECAC women's ice hockey during the 2016–17 NCAA Division I women's ice hockey season.

Offseason

July 21: 20 members of the Brown team were named to the ECAC All-Academic Team, the most in the program's history.

Recruiting

Roster

Schedule

|-
!colspan=12 style="background:#381C00; color:white;"| Regular Season

Awards and honors

Monica Elvin, Goaltender, All-Ivy Second Team

References

Brown
2016 in sports in Rhode Island
2017 in sports in Rhode Island
Brown Bears women's ice hockey seasons